Chelsea Eze (born Chelsea Ada Ezerioha; 15 November 1985) is a Nigerian actress. She came into prominence in her first Nollywood film Silent Scandals where she acted alongside Genevieve Nnaji and Majid Michel. She also won the Most Promising Actress award for her role in the film at the 6th Africa Movie Academy Awards.

Early life
Chelsea was born in Kano State though she's an Igbo descent from Umuahia, Abia State. Her parents were both Bankers. She attended Federal Government Girls College Minjibir and St. Louis Secondary School both in Kano. She studied English and linguistics at University of Maiduguri. According to an interview with The Punch she stated that "My childhood was fun because then, Kano was very peaceful and beautiful".

Career
Prior to her role in Silent Scandals, she was a model and her only acting experience was in stage plays, which she did in church. She was invited by producer Vivian Ejike to audition for a supporting role in Silent Scandals, and she was chosen to appear in the film. She has featured in several other popular films like Two Brides and a Baby (2011), Hoodrush (2012) and Murder at Prime Suites (2013).

Filmography

Accolades

See also
 List of Nigerian actors

References

21st-century Nigerian actresses
University of Maiduguri alumni
Most Promising Actor Africa Movie Academy Award winners
Living people
Nigerian film actresses
Nigerian models
Igbo actresses
1986 births
Actresses from Abia State
Nigerian film award winners